In enzymology, a sequoyitol dehydrogenase is an enzyme that catalyzes the chemical reaction

5-O-methyl-myo-inositol + NAD+  2D-5-O-methyl-2,3,5/4,6-pentahydroxycyclohexanone + NADH + H+

Thus, the two substrates of this enzyme are 5-O-methyl-myo-inositol and NAD+, whereas its 3 products are 2D-5-O-methyl-2,3,5/4,6-pentahydroxycyclohexanone, NADH, and H+.

This enzyme belongs to the family of oxidoreductases, specifically those acting on the CH-OH group of donor with NAD+ or NADP+ as acceptor. The systematic name of this enzyme class is 5-O-methyl-myo-inositol:NAD+ oxidoreductase. This enzyme is also called D-pinitol dehydrogenase.

References

 

EC 1.1.1
NADH-dependent enzymes
Enzymes of unknown structure